Anacornia is a genus of North American dwarf spiders that was first described by Ralph Vary Chamberlin & Vaine Wilton Ivie in 1933.  it contains only two species, both found in the United States: A. microps and A. proceps.

See also
 List of Linyphiidae species

References

Araneomorphae genera
Linyphiidae
Spiders of the United States